Michael Enfield (born July 19, 1983 in Ventura, California) is an American soccer player currently playing for SP Barcelona in La Gran Liga de Oxnard. He is a member of the United States national beach soccer team.

Career

College and Amateur
Enfield attended Ventura High School, and played college soccer at the University of California, Los Angeles for four seasons, from 2001 to 2004. He appeared in seventy-eight games for the Bruins, scoring thirty-nine goals and assisting on fifteen.

During his college years he also played for Orange County Blue Star in the USL Premier Development League.

Professional
Enfield was drafted in the second round, fifteenth overall, by Los Angeles Galaxy in the 2005 MLS SuperDraft, and played in eleven games for the team, scoring one goal, before being waived at the end of the season.

Enfield trialled with Australian side Sydney FC, throughout the second half of March 2007, and played two forty-five-minute halves in trial games, scoring against the Wollongong Wolves in a 3–2 victory, and then having a hand in all three goals as Sydney beat the Marconi Stallions 3–0. On April 7, 2007, Enfield signed a two-year contract with the former A-League champions.

He made his debut for the club on September 9, 2007, against Perth Glory FC, coming on as a second-half substitute and becoming the first Jewish player in A-League history.

In late September, he suffered a serious injury to his left knee during training which ended his season. Enfield underwent knee reconstruction surgery to repair tearing to both the anterior cruciate and medial collateral ligaments, and was expected to return to training at Sydney in mid-2008. However, Enfield suffered another major setback when an arthroscope test showed he still had cartilage damage. Enfield missed the start of Sydney's 2008–2009 season and, due to his extensive injury issues, he was released at the end of the season.

Enfield returned to his native California in 2010 and subsequently signed to play with Ventura County Fusion in the USL Premier Development League. Recently, Enfield has been playing with the amateur side SP Barcelona in the USASA-affiliated La Gran Liga de Oxnard based in Oxnard, California.

Personal life
While living in Sydney and not playing due to injury, Enfield carried out a great deal of community work on behalf of Sydney FC.
Enfield currently is the Assistant coach to the Men's Soccer team at Santa Monica College.
Enfield is the grandson of actors Craig Reynolds (born Harold Hugh Enfield) and Barbara Pepper.

Honors
On June 26, 2011, he was inducted into the Southern California Jewish Sports Hall of Fame.

Los Angeles Galaxy
Major League Soccer MLS Cup (1): 2005

References

1983 births
Living people
People from Ventura, California
Jewish American sportspeople
American expatriate soccer players
Soccer players from California
Expatriate soccer players in Australia
A-League Men players
Sydney FC players
LA Galaxy players
Major League Soccer players
Orange County Blue Star players
Ventura County Fusion players
UCLA Bruins men's soccer players
USL League Two players
LA Galaxy draft picks
United States men's youth international soccer players
Maccabiah Games silver medalists for the United States
Association football midfielders
American soccer players
Sportspeople from Ventura County, California
All-American men's college soccer players
American beach soccer players
Maccabiah Games medalists in football
21st-century American Jews